The Draconettidae, slope dragonets, are a small family (about 14 species) of fish in the order Perciformes. They are found in temperate to tropical waters of the Atlantic, Indian and western Pacific Oceans. They are closely related to, and appear similar to, the fish of the Callionymidae. Like the callionymids, they are  bottom-dwelling fish, and usually sexually dimorphic.

See also
List of fish families

References

External links
 Smith, J.B.L. 1963. Fishes of the families Draconettidae and Callionymidae from the Red Sea and the Western Indian Ocean. Ichthyological Bulletin; No. 28. Department of Ichthyology, Rhodes University, Grahamstown, South Africa

 
Taxa named by David Starr Jordan